Inès Granvorka (born ) is a Swiss female volleyball player. 

With her club Voléro Zürich she competed at the 2015 FIVB Volleyball Women's Club World Championship.

Clubs

References

External links
 profile at FIVB.org
 profile at CEV 
https://www.lequipe.fr/Volley-ball/Actualites/Ines-la-granvorka-suisse/399392

1991 births
Living people
Swiss women's volleyball players
Place of birth missing (living people)